Vaz-e Tangeh (also Romanized as Vāz-e Tangeh) is a village in Natel-e Restaq Rural District, Chamestan District, Nur County, Mazandaran Province, Iran. At the 2006 census, its population was 236, in 60 families.

References 

Populated places in Nur County